Patricia "Tricia" Ann Cotham (born 1978) is a former member of the North Carolina House of Representatives from the 100th district (Mecklenburg County) and congressional candidate. In March 2007, she was appointed by Governor Mike Easley, upon the recommendation of local Democratic Party leaders, to replace state Representative James B. Black, who had resigned.

At 28 years old, Cotham became the youngest member of the 2007-2008 session of the state legislature and the youngest woman to ever serve in the NC House of Representatives. Cotham served as Co-Chair of the House's K-12 Education subcommittee from 2008-2010.

In 2008, she was named UNC Chapel Hill's School of Education's Young Alumna of the Year and the North Carolina Association of Educators (NCAE) graded Cotham an "A+" Legislator.

Prior to serving in the legislature, Cotham began her first year of classroom teaching in 2001, where she taught social studies and was named Most Outstanding First Year Middle School Teacher of the East Region of the Charlotte-Mecklenburg School District. She started her first year as an Assistant Principal at East Mecklenburg High School in the fall of 2006 and was appointed to the legislature in March 2007.

Cotham chose not to run for re-election in 2016. She later said she would consider running for the U.S. House of Representatives in the newly redrawn 12th congressional district. Cotham filed to run for the seat on March 21, 2016, but lost the primary to incumbent Congresswoman Alma Adams.

Family
Cotham’s mother, Pat Cotham, is a former Democratic National Committee member and currently a member of the Mecklenburg County Board of Commissioners, having been elected in 2012. Cotham's cousin, Emily Cain, also a Democrat, was elected to the Maine House of Representatives in 2004 at age 24 as its youngest female member. Cain served as the Minority Leader for the Maine House Democrats.

Cotham has two sons. Cotham lives in Charlotte, NC.

Electoral history

2022

2016

2014

2012

2010

2008

References

News & Observer: Black replacement will be youngest legislator
Charlotte Observer: Educator chosen to fill Black's old seat

External links
Official legislative page
Twitter

1978 births
Democratic Party members of the North Carolina House of Representatives
Women state legislators in North Carolina
Living people
21st-century American politicians
21st-century American women politicians
Politicians from Charlotte, North Carolina
People from Matthews, North Carolina
University of North Carolina at Chapel Hill School of Education alumni